A registered building is the Isle of Man equivalent of a listed building in the United Kingdom.

Registered Buildings of the Isle of Man lists them.

References